Blaenbedw Fawr is a small village in the  community of Llandysiliogogo, Ceredigion, Wales, which is 68.9 miles (110.8 km) from Cardiff and 187 miles (300.9 km) from London. Blaenbedw Fawr is represented in the Senedd by Elin Jones (Plaid Cymru) and is part of the Ceredigion constituency in the House of Commons.

References

See also
List of localities in Wales by population

Villages in Ceredigion